Eyes of Terror (also known as Visions of Murder II and Visions of Terror) is a 1994 American thriller television film and a sequel to Visions of Murder (1993) starring Barbara Eden reprising her role as psychic psychologist Dr. Jesse Newman.

Directed by Sam Pillsbury and written by Duane Poole, Eyes of Terror was shot on location in San Jose, California and premiered on NBC as part of their Friday Night Mystery series, on March 18, 1994.

Synopsis
Dr. Jesse Newman is now counselling members of the San Francisco Police Department and assigned to treating David Zaccariah, a grieving policeman who lost his partner of ten years in a shootout. Days later, it seems that the case is wrapped up when the perfect suspect is apprehended. But David has inadvertently given the most important clue of all to the person he should have most avoided: Jesse Newman. It's a lucky coin that belonged to his partner, and it triggers a revealing series of psychic visions for Jesse. The visions implicate much more than just the killer; they reveal the sordid habits of San Francisco's business and political elite.

Cast
 Barbara Eden as Dr. Jesse Newman
 Michael Nouri as Lt. David Zaccariah
 Ted Marcoux as Det. Tony Carpelli
 Missy Crider as Kimberly
 Joan Pringle as Gwen Singleton
 Steven Anthony Jones as Capt. Jim Armstrong 
 David Marciano as Kenneth Burch
 Ed Trucco

Home media
The film was released twice on Region 1 DVD under the title Visions of Terror on November 16, 2006 by Sterling Home Entertainment and March 27, 2012 by Fisher Klingenstein Films.

References

External links

1994 films
1994 television films
1994 thriller films
1990s English-language films
1990s psychological thriller films
American psychological thriller films
American sequel films
American thriller television films
Fictional portrayals of the San Francisco Police Department
Films directed by Sam Pillsbury
Films scored by Michael Hoenig
Films set in San Francisco
Films shot in San Jose, California
NBC network original films
Television sequel films
1990s American films